Viedebanttia is a genus of mites in the family Acaridae.

Species
 Viedebanttia coniferae (Sevastianov & Marroch, 1993) 
 Viedebanttia diamanus Fain & Schwan, 1984
 Viedebanttia egorovi Klimov, 1998
 Viedebanttia fuscipes (Vitzthum, 1924)
 Viedebanttia longipes (Volgin, 1951)
 Viedebanttia macrocnemis (Zachvatkin, 1941)
 Viedebanttia schmitzi Oudemans, 1929
 Viedebanttia vitzthumi (Mahunka, 1979)

References

Acaridae